This is a list of Honorary Fellows of Newnham College, Cambridge. A list of current honorary fellows is published on the college's website at  Honorary Fellows List of Honorary Fellows.

 Marin Alsop
 Joan Armatrading
 Jenn Ashworth
 Joan Bakewell, Baroness Bakewell
 Clare Balding
 Dame Carol Black
 Dame Mary Beard
 Betty Boothroyd, Baroness Boothroyd
 Jane Brown
 Dame Antonia Byatt
 Anne Campbell
 Jean Coussins, Baroness Coussins
 P. E. Easterling
 Sylvia Frey
 Dame Uta Frith
 Rosalind Gilmore
 Dame Jane Goodall
 Helene Hayman, Baroness Hayman
 Dame Patricia Hodgson
 Brigid Hogan
 Ann Mallalieu, Baroness Mallalieu
 Brenda Milner
 Julia Neuberger, Baroness Neuberger
 Jessye Norman
 Mary Beth Norton
 Onora O'Neill, Baroness O'Neill of Bengarve
 Dame Sue Owen
 Dame Fiona Reynolds
 Joyce Reynolds
 Dame Alison Richard
 Vivien Rose, Lady Rose of Colmworth
 Pat Simpson
 Ali Smith
 Elizabeth A. Thompson
 Dame Emma Thompson
 Janet Todd
 Sandi Toksvig
 Claire Tomalin
 Dame Margaret Weston
 Shirley Williams, Baroness Williams of Crosby
 Rosie Young
 Froma Zeitlin

References

Honorary Fellows List of Honorary Fellows

 
Newnham College, Cambridge
Newnham College